Pennsylvania Route 378 (PA 378) is a north-to-south road in Lehigh and Northampton counties in the Lehigh Valley region of the U.S. state of Pennsylvania. The southern terminus is at PA 309 in Center Valley. Its northern terminus is at U.S. Route 22 (US 22) in Bethlehem. The route heads north from PA 309 as a two-lane undivided road through Upper Saucon Township and Lower Saucon Township before crossing South Mountain into the city of Bethlehem. Here, PA 378 follows city streets through Bethlehem's South Side, intersecting the northern terminus of PA 412. The route crosses the Lehigh River and becomes a four-lane freeway that continues north to US 22. PA 378 is the only highway from US 22 to Center City Bethlehem, and a quick route for visitors traveling to the Wind Creek Bethlehem casino resort on the city's South Side.

The portion of PA 378 south of Bethlehem was originally numbered as PA 12 in 1928 and renumbered to PA 191 in 1961. Construction on the freeway from West Broad Street to US 22 began in 1966 and finished two years later. This freeway was numbered Interstate 378 (I-378) and served as a spur of I-78, which formerly ran along the US 22 freeway. When I-78 was rerouted from US 22 to south of the city, the spur became disjointed from its parent. I-378 was downgraded to state route status in 1971. Three years later, the PA 378 designation replaced PA 191 from Center Valley to Third Street in Bethlehem. The state did not remove the exit tabs for the freeway section, making PA 378 one of only a few state freeways with exit numbers (another one is PA 309 in Wilkes-Barre). The exit numbers also go in the wrong direction: Exit 3 is south of Exit 1, most likely due to the freeway being built when Pennsylvania still practiced sequential exit numbering. In 2009, the portion north of the Lehigh River was named the Fred B. Rooney Highway after Fred B. Rooney.

Route description

PA 378 begins at two separate intersections with PA 309 in the community of Center Valley in Upper Saucon Township, Lehigh County, which is in the Lehigh Valley. The route heads northward as a three-lane road with a center left-turn lane, passing through Center Valley and paralleling Old Bethlehem Pike. The road runs through a mix of farm fields and woods with residential and commercial development. After an intersection with Preston Lane, PA 378 turns to the north-northeast. Farther north, the highway crosses Saucon Creek and passes to the west of the Saucon Valley Country Club.  At the intersection with Osgood Avenue, PA 378 turns to the northeast, crossing the Old Bethlehem Pike soon after. After crossing Saucon Valley Road, the highway comes to an intersection with Center Valley Parkway, an arterial boulevard.

After that, the highway enters Lower Saucon Township in Northampton County and crosses under I-78 without an interchange. Past this, PA 378 heads north through the community of Seidersville, where it passes homes and businesses as a four-lane road parallel to Old Philadelphia Pike. The road traverses South Mountain where it runs through forested areas with some homes. Descending the mountain, PA 378 bends northwestward as a four lane arterial known as Wyandotte Street until leaving the University Heights area near Holy Ghost Cemetery. PA 378 continues into the city of Bethlehem, where it turns northward into residential areas as a two-lane road and is called Wyandotte Street. In the South Side section of the city, PA 378 intersects with the northern terminus of PA 412 (Broadway). The route continues northward and intersects a ramp to 3rd Street that provides access to PA 412, at which point it widens to four lanes. PA 378 passes over Norfolk Southern's Lehigh Line before crossing the Lehigh River on the Hill to Hill Bridge.

PA 378 heads northward across the Hill to Hill Bridge, at which point it crosses back into Lehigh County. The route crosses over West Lehigh Street and intersects with the off-ramp to Main Street in Bethlehem. There was formerly a ramp to 2nd Avenue, but that has been closed and is only used by pedestrians. After this interchange, PA 378 becomes a four-lane freeway and is named the Fred B. Rooney Highway. The highway continues northward through the city, crossing under West Broad Street and reaching a southbound interchange with North Street, which leads to Center City and Third Avenue. The freeway continues northward, crossing over and receiving an on-ramp from Union Boulevard.

The road turns to the northwest and interchanges with Eighth Avenue at exit 2E and exit 2W northbound and exit 2 southbound. PA 378 turns westward through Bethlehem, paralleling Union Boulevard and crossing under Fourteenth Avenue. The route then turns northward, crossing under Eaton Avenue and a Norfolk Southern rail line and passing the Hal Fenicle Memorial Park. PA 378 continues northbound, interchanging with and crossing under Catasauqua Road. After running to the southwest of Lehigh Valley Hospital–Muhlenberg, the freeway enters an interchange with US 22 (Lehigh Valley Thruway), PA 378 northbound traffic is directed onto US 22 westbound.

History

The at-grade portion of PA 378 south of Bethlehem was originally designated in the 1928 numbering as an alignment of PA 12, a route crossing through Northampton and Monroe Counties. On April 17, 1961, PA 12 was decommissioned in favor of PA 191, a  highway from Center Valley to the New York state line on the Delaware River. In 1974, following the decommissioning of I-378 to PA 378, PA 191 had its southern terminus moved to US 22 in Brodhead, and the former alignment between Center Valley and Bethlehem became a southern, non-expressway extension of PA 378.

The current alignment of PA 378 was first constructed from West Broad Street in Bethlehem to the current interchange with the Lehigh Valley Thruway. As part of the Interstate Highway System, the Lehigh Valley Thruway was cosigned as the alignment of I-78. Upon completion of the freeway in 1968, the new highway was designated I-378, a spur off of I-78. However, in 1970, as I-78 was realigned to a new bypass to the south of Bethlehem, I-378 was decommissioned and replaced with the alignment of PA 378 the following year.

Since completion, PA 378 has undergone little major change, but the highway has undergone several rehabilitations. The Hill to Hill Bridge received a minor fire during reconstruction of the bridge, when a piece of equipment had its motor catch fire on April 13, 2009, when the bridge was undergoing re-painting. The bridge repainting was completed on May 15, 2009, after the closing of a bridge and was re-opened later due to rainfall in the area.

On September 23, 2009, the Pennsylvania Department of Transportation announced plans and designs for an upgrade and redesign of PA 378 through Bethlehem at its interchange with West Third Street, although this met public criticism. Part of the project, construction of a new ramp from Wyandotte Street to West Third Street, was completed in September 2011.  Completion of the widening of West Third Street and PA 412 was completed later in 2011.  The $5.1 million project will also include a widening of PA 412 between Exit 67 on I-78 and Daly Avenue in Bethlehem to two lanes in each direction. On November 21, 2009, the project was given funding from the American Recovery and Reinvestment Act of 2009 signed by President Barack Obama in 2009. The Pennsylvania Department of Transportation received $1 billion worth of funding from the act.

Major intersections

See also

Pennsylvania Route 581 - another state route with exit numbers.

References

External links 

 Pennsylvania Highways: PA 378
 Pennsylvania Roads - PA 378
 The Roads of Metro Philadelphia: Bethlehem Spur Route (PA 378, former I-378)
 Pennsylvania Highways: I-378
 I-378 on Kurumi.com

378
Limited-access roads in Pennsylvania
Transportation in Lehigh County, Pennsylvania
Transportation in Northampton County, Pennsylvania